The ninth and final season of the American comedy television series Scrubs (also known as Scrubs: Med School) premiered on ABC on December 1, 2009, and concluded on March 17, 2010, and consists of 13 episodes. This season marked a major change in the series; it takes place at a different location and only three of the seven main characters from the first eight seasons remained as regular main characters. The rest of the cast is made up of new recruits, including Lucy, played by Kerry Bishé, who is also the show's new narrator. Former star Zach Braff returned for six episodes of the season.

The new season focuses on students at a med school at the fictional Winston University, rather than interns at a hospital. Doctors Perry Cox and Christopher Turk, played by John C. McGinley and Donald Faison respectively, returned as teachers. The show's filming location moved from the North Hollywood Medical Center to sets at Culver Studios. The series takes place at the new Sacred Heart Hospital, located on the Winston University campus.

The season takes place over a year after the events of the last episode of the eighth season, "My Finale", which was expected to be the last episode and ended many of the series' long-running storylines. However, Bill Lawrence was approached concerning more episodes, and as a result, the show entered its ninth season. 

Review aggregator Metacritic found critical reception to the new format to be "generally positive" and assigned an average score of 64/100, though reviews were varied, with the Chicago Sun Times calling the season "promising", but USA Today dismissing it as a "deal-driven mistake". The season nonetheless saw Scrubs receive its lowest-ever ratings, with an average of 3.79 million tuning in, down from 5.61 million the previous season (though the show's overall ranking had improved).

Zach Braff announced on March 22, 2010 via Facebook that it appeared that Scrubs would not be renewed for a tenth season, and on May 14, 2010, ABC officially cancelled the series.

Background
The eighth season was expected to be the last for Scrubs, but in May 2009, ABC announced that the series had been renewed for an additional 13 episodes. John C. McGinley and Donald Faison signed one-year deals and were the only cast members to stay on as regulars. Zach Braff appeared in six episodes, in which he was billed as main cast, to assist in transitioning the show, while Sarah Chalke signed on to guest star in four episodes throughout the season. Ken Jenkins appeared in nine episodes, and Neil Flynn, who was also busy with his new show The Middle, appeared in a single scene in the season's first episode. Judy Reyes was the only original cast member to not return, after declining to appear in a recurring guest role as she only wanted to return full-time. Eliza Coupe, who portrayed Denise Mahoney beginning in season eight, became a series regular, along with new cast members Kerry Bishé, Michael Mosley and Dave Franco.

Lawrence considered the eighth season to be the end of the show Scrubs, going so far as to ask ABC if he could change the name to Scrubs Med. ABC declined, but Lawrence still advised fans to treat it as a new show, even putting a caption under the "Created By" on the X-ray in the opening sequence saying [Med School].

Cast and characters

Main cast
Zach Braff as Dr. John "J.D." Dorian
Donald Faison as Dr. Chris Turk
John C. McGinley as Dr. Perry Cox
Eliza Coupe as Dr. Denise Mahoney
Kerry Bishé as Lucy Bennett
Michael Mosley as Drew Suffin
Dave Franco as Cole Aaronson

Recurring roles
Ken Jenkins as Dr. Bob Kelso
Nicky Whelan as Maya
Robert Maschio as Dr. Todd Quinlan
Windell Middlebrooks as Captain Melvis Duncook
Matthew Moy as Trang
Steven Cragg as Lieutenant Frank Underhill
Sarah Chalke as Dr. Elliot Reid

Guest stars
Neil Flynn as The Janitor
Sam Lloyd as Ted Buckland
The Blanks as the Worthless Peons
Kate Micucci as Stephanie Gooch
Christa Miller as Jordan Sullivan
Sonal Shah as Dr. Sonja "Sunny" Dey

Production
Show creator Bill Lawrence wanted to change the name of the show to Scrubs Med, but ABC did not allow this. The setting shifted from the original hospital building to a new Sacred Heart medical school and university campus, with shooting locations moving to Culver Studios. Executive producers Neil Goldman and Garrett Donovan, and Bill Callahan departed from the series and were replaced by Jonathan Groff, Zach Braff, and Josh Bycel, who also served as the co-showrunner, alongside creator/executive producer Bill Lawrence who was doing double duty at the time with both Scrubs and his new show Cougar Town.

Every writer from previous seasons departed from the show with the exception of Lawrence and Andy Schwartz. Sean Russell returned to write a freelance episode, just as he had done previously in season 6.

Writing staff
Bill Lawrence – executive producer/co-head writer
Josh Bycel – executive producer/co-head writer
Corey Nickerson – supervising producer
Kevin Etten – supervising producer
Jonathan Groff – executive producer (episodes 1–4, 6) / consulting producer (episodes 5, 8–13)
Steven Cragg & Brian Bradley – consulting producers
David Walpert – consulting producer (episodes 5, 8–13)
Prentice Penny – co-producer
Andy Schwartz – executive story editor
Leila Strachan – staff writer
Lon Zimmet & Dan Rubin – staff writers

Production staff
Bill Lawrence – executive producer/co-showrunner
Josh Bycel – executive producer/co-showrunner
Zach Braff – executive producer
Randall Winston – co-executive producer
Liz Newman – producer
Danny Rose – co-producer

Directors
Includes directors who directed 2 or more episodes, or directors who are part of the cast and crew
Michael Spiller (3 episodes)
John Putch (2 episodes)
Michael McDonald (2 episodes)
Rick Blue (editor) (1 episode)

Episodes

References

General references

Inline citations

External links 

 

 
2009 American television seasons
2010 American television seasons
9